Three manga adaptations based on Muv-Luv and its sequel Muv-Luv Alternative have been serialized in MediaWorks's, and later ASCII Media Works's Dengeki Daioh manga magazine. The first adaptation, called Muv-Luv, was written and illustrated by Ukyō Takao and covers the Extra part of the first game. It was collected and republished in three volumes by MediaWorks. The second series is Muv-Luv Unlimited and covers the Unlimited portion of the first game. It ran for four volumes and was written and illustrated by Tomo Hiryokawa. The third series, Muv-Luv Alternative, was  written and illustrated by Azusa Maxima and based on the second game of the same name. It began its serial run in the February 2007 issue of Dengeki Daioh. Seventeen compilation volumes have been published by ASCII Media Works.

The novel series Muv-Luv Alternative: Total Eclipse has also been adapted into a manga by Takashi Ishigaki and three compilation volumes have been published. Another novel series, Schwarzesmarken, detailing the events in East Germany during the BETA invasion in 1983, serialized in the magazine Tech Gian, replacing Total Eclipse. Seven volumes of Schwarzesmarken have been released, in addition to the light novel series Schwarzesmarken Requiem, of which two volumes have been released, and both series feature art by Carnelian.

Manga 

! colspan="3" | Muv-Luv
|-

! colspan="3" | Muv-Luv Unlimited
|-

! colspan="3" | Muv-Luv Alternative
|-

! colspan="3" | Muv-Luv Alternative: Total Eclipse
|-

! colspan="3" | Muv-Luv Alternative: Total Eclipse Rising
|-

! colspan="3" | Muv-Luv Alternative: Moonlight Over the Dark Night
|-

! colspan="3" | Muv-Luv Alternative: Total Eclipse Imperial City
|-

Novels

References

Muv-Luv